A number of steamships were named Hamburg, including:

, later USS Powhatan

, later SS Hanseatic and then SS Maxim Gorkiy

Ship names